Peperomia abnormis is a species of plant in the family Piperaceae. It is endemic to Colombia and Ecuador.

References

abnormis
Endemic flora of Ecuador
Near threatened plants
Taxonomy articles created by Polbot
Taxa named by William Trelease